Robert McBride (1856–26 November 1934) was a unionist politician in Northern Ireland.

Biography
McBride worked as a farmer, and with textiles.  He was also a lay preacher with the Church of Ireland.  He joined the Ulster Unionist Party and was elected in Down at the 1921 Northern Ireland general election.  He held the seat in 1925, and won West Down at the 1929 general election. He retired in 1933, but was elected to the Senate of Northern Ireland the following year, shortly before his death.

References

1856 births
1934 deaths
Farmers from Northern Ireland
Members of the House of Commons of Northern Ireland 1921–1925
Members of the House of Commons of Northern Ireland 1925–1929
Members of the House of Commons of Northern Ireland 1929–1933
Members of the Senate of Northern Ireland 1933–1937
Ulster Unionist Party members of the House of Commons of Northern Ireland
Members of the House of Commons of Northern Ireland for County Down constituencies
Ulster Unionist Party members of the Senate of Northern Ireland